William Ward (1769–1823) was an English pioneer Baptist missionary, author, printer and translator.

Early life
Ward was born at Derby on 20 October 1769, and was the son of John Ward, a carpenter and builder of that town, and grandson of Thomas Ward, a farmer at Stretton, near Burton upon Trent in Staffordshire. His father died while he was a child, and the care of his upbringing fell to his mother. He was placed with a schoolmaster named Congreve, near Derby, and afterwards with another named Breary.

On leaving school he was apprenticed to a Derby printer and bookseller Drewry, with whom he continued two years after the expiration of his indentures, assisting him to edit the Derby Mercury. He then removed to Stafford, where he assisted Joshua Drewry, a relative of his former master, to edit the Staffordshire Advertiser and in either 1794 or 1795 proceeded to Hull, where he followed his business as a printer, and was for some time editor of the Hull Advertiser.

Religion
Ward early in life became a Baptist, and on 26 August 1796 he was baptised at Hull. Preaching constantly in the neighbouring villages, he became known as a man of promise, and, with the assistance of a member of the Baptist community named Fishwick, he proceeded in August 1797 to Ewood Hall, near Halifax in Yorkshire, the theological academy of John Fawcett (1740–1817), where he studied for a year and a half.

Missionary work

In the autumn of 1798, the Baptist mission committee visited Ewood, and Ward offered himself as a missionary, influenced perhaps by a remark made to him in 1793 by William Carey concerning the need for a printer in the Indian mission field.

Ward sailed from England in the Criterion in May 1799, in company with Joshua Marshman. On arriving at Calcutta he was prevented from joining Carey by an order from the Government, and was thereby obliged to proceed to the Danish settlement of Serampore, where he was joined by Carey.

In India, Ward's time was chiefly occupied in overseeing the community's printing press, which was used to disseminate the scriptures, once they had been translated into Bengáli, Mahratta, Tamil, and twenty-three other languages. Numerous philological works were also issued and Ward still found time to both keep a copious diary and to preach the gospel to the natives.

On 10 May 1802 he was married at Serampore to the widow of John Fountain, another missionary, by whom he left two daughters.

Until 1806, he made frequent tours amongst the towns and villages of the province, but after that year the increasing claims of the press on his time, and the extension of the missionary labours in Serampore and Calcutta, prevented him quitting headquarters. In 1812 the printing office was destroyed by fire. It contained the types of all the scriptures that had been printed, to the value of at least ten thousand pounds. The moulds for casting fresh type, however, were recovered from the débris, and with the help of friends in Great Britain the loss was soon repaired.

Serampore College

In 1818, Ward, having been for some time in bad health, revisited England. Here he was entrusted with the task of pleading for funds with which to endow a new college at Serampore which he had founded along with Joshua Marshman and William Carey, for the purpose of instructing natives in European literature and science.

He undertook a series of journeys throughout England and Scotland, and also visited Holland and North Germany. In October 1820 he embarked for New York, and travelled through the United States, returning to England in April 1821. On 28 May he sailed for India in the Alberta, carrying funds for Serampore College; as a result, Ward, Marshman and Carey became known as the Serampore trio.

Death
Ward died of cholera at Serampore on 7 March 1823, and was interred in the mission burial-ground.

Written works
Besides his sermons, Ward was also the author of:

'Account of the Writings, Religion, and Manners of the Hindoos,’ Serampúr, 1811, 4 vols. 4to; 5th edit., abridged, Madras, 1863, 8vo.
'Farewell Letters in Britain and America on returning to Bengal in 1821,’ London, 1821, 12mo; 2nd edit. 1821.
'Brief Memoir of Krishna-Pal, the first Hindoo, in Bengal, who broke the Chain of the Cast by embracing the Gospel;’ 2nd edit., London, 1823, 12mo.

He was also the author of several sonnets and short poems which were printed as an appendix to a memoir of him by Samuel Stennett. A portrait, engraved by R. Baker from a painting by Overton, is prefixed to the same work.

Sources
Stennett's "Memoirs of the Life of William Ward", 1825;
"Memoir of William Ward", Philadelphia;
Simpson's Life prefixed to "View of History, Literature, and Religion of the Hindoos" 1863

Marshman's "Carey, Marshman, and Ward" 1864
Full text of Memoir of the Rev. William Ward, American Sunday School Union, 1828.

External links 
 Rev. William Ward biography, Center for Study of the Life and Work of William Carey, D.D. (1761-1834)

1769 births
1823 deaths
19th-century Baptists
Baptist missionaries in India
Burials in West Bengal
English Baptist missionaries
English sermon writers
Founders of Indian schools and colleges
Missionary educators
People from Derby
Translators of the Bible into Bengali
Deaths from cholera
British people in colonial India
Missionary linguists
Scholars from West Bengal